Queen Gyeongseong of the Gyeongju Gim clan (Hangul: 경성왕후 김씨, Hanja: 敬成王后 金氏; d. 23 September 1086) was a Goryeo princess as the only daughter of King Hyeonjong and Consort Wonsun who became a queen consort through her marriage with her half older brother, King Deokjong as his second (formally as first and primary) wife. From this marriage, Queen Gyeongseong became the ninth reigned Goryeo queen who followed her maternal clan after Queen Wonhwa, her stepmother.

When still a child and royal princess, she was called Oldest Daughter of the Gyeongheung Residence (경흥원 장녀, 景興院 長女) since it was her mother's official residence. Since the same clan couldn't married, she then followed her maternal clan (Gyeongju Gim) and became the 19-years-old Deokjong (her half brother)'s queen consort in 1034. However, their marriage lasted only 7 months which Deokjong died in the same year, so she lived about 52 years alone until her death in 1086. During her lived-alone, at least she watched the reigns of four monarchs (Jeongjong, Munjong, Sunjong, Seonjong). She later buried in Jilleung (질릉, 質陵) alongside her late husband and received her Posthumous name in 1096. Since the couple was childless, so the queen couldn't or didn't receive the honorary name like the other queen dowagers.

Posthumous name
In April 1140 (18th year reign of King Injong), name Yu-jeong (유정, 柔貞) was added.
In October 1253 (40th year reign of King Gojong), name Gwan-suk (관숙, 寬肅) was added to her Posthumous name too.

References

External links
Queen Gyeongseong on Encykorea .

Goryeo princesses
Royal consorts of the Goryeo Dynasty
Korean queens consort
11th-century Korean women
1086 deaths
Year of birth unknown
Gim clan of Gyeongju